Air General Gustavo Leigh Guzmán (September 19, 1920 – September 29, 1999) was a Chilean general, who represented the Air Force in the 1973 Chilean coup d'état and, for a time, in the ruling junta that followed. Leigh was forced out of the military government in 1978.

Biography

Leigh was born in Santiago, son of Army Colonel Hernán Leigh Bañados and Laura Guzmán Cea. After a career as a combat pilot, President Salvador Allende named him commander-in-chief of the Air Force on August 17, 1973, disregarding the established basis of seniority. However, Leigh was the first to sign the coup document, drafted by Vice Admiral José Toribio Merino, to depose Allende.

Leigh quickly emerged as the toughest member in the four-man military junta. Just hours after the coup, Leigh vowed that the military would "eradicate the Marxist cancer from our fatherland, until the last consequences." It was on his personal orders, he disclosed later, that the Air Force bombarded and heavily damaged the presidential palace to put down the resistance by Allende and a small group of his followers. He responded to criticisms of his order to bomb the La Moneda palace saying, "It was a hard measure to take, but believe me when I say that [...] it was a measure that saved many lives, because President Allende had decided to die in La Moneda [...]."

A fierce persecution of leftists followed, and Leigh's Air Force gained a reputation as especially implacable with dissidents. Leigh defended the coup, arguing that a civil war between Chileans was inevitable. When American President Jimmy Carter criticized the military rule in Chile in 1977, Leigh said, "He [Carter] is a hypocrite. He condemns Chile, but at the same time he wants closer relations with a dictatorship like Castro's in Cuba, that had led an authoritarian regime for 18 years."

He purged the Air Force of left-wing officers such as General Alberto Bachelet (the father of Michelle Bachelet, future Chilean president) and repeatedly called on Chileans to denounce left-wingers to the new authorities. Nonetheless he clashed with Augusto Pinochet, the leader of the junta  over the latter's refusal to name a date for a return to democracy. Leigh opposed Pinochet's growing power within the junta. In 1978, when Pinochet called a vote to request that Chileans reject the United Nation's condemnation of the regime's human rights record, Leigh called the move "typical of governments in which power is in the hands of a single dictator." Pinochet believed Leigh wanted to challenge him to lead the country. "Pinochet always felt that I was interested in taking over from him, something that never even entered my mind," Leigh said in one of his last television interviews.

Exit from the Junta and latter years
General Leigh was a supporter of strong state intervention in the economy. He was heavily influenced by the Egyptian model being built by Anwar Sadat (he was a close friend of Hosni Mubarak, the Egyptian Air Force Chief, since 1971) of a mixed economy based on free market principles but a strong state presence in heavy industry and a strong state regulation over imports and the financial speculation market. He had continuous disagreements with the prevailing free market economic policy of the so-called Chicago Boys that was favoured by the US as well as Pinochet himself. He was strongly opposed to any divestment or privatisation in the State owned mining company Codelco. That led to his dismissal on July 24, 1978, in a decree signed by other junta members.

The junta selected General Fernando Matthei to replace him. Despite his strong differences with General Pinochet, he strongly opposed Pinochet's 1998 arrest as a violation of Chilean sovereignty.

Leigh was detained by a judge investigating his role in the disappearance of twelve communist leaders, but the Supreme Court of Chile ordered his release by virtue of the Law of Amnesty.

Assassination attempt and death
On March 21, 1990 members of the leftist guerrilla group, the Manuel Rodríguez Patriotic Front, broke into Leigh's office and opened fire at him. Five bullets hit his body. Other than the loss of an eye, he was able to make a complete recovery.

Leigh died of cardiovascular ailments in Santiago's Air Force Hospital on September 29, 1999, aged 79.

Literature 

Marras S. (1988) Confesiones. Las ediciones del Ornitorrinco, Santiago.

Varas F. (1979) Gustavo Leigh. El general disidente. Editorial Aconcagua, Santiago.

García de Leigh G. (2017) Leigh, El general republicano. GLG Ediciones, Santiago.

References

External links
Short biography

1920 births
1999 deaths
Chilean anti-communists
Heads of state of Chile
Chilean Air Force generals
Chilean people of English descent
Leaders who took power by coup
People from Santiago
20th-century Chilean military personnel